Michael Peden is a British record producer, remixer and composer, best known for his work with the British musical duo Lighthouse Family. With his former band the Chimes, Peden had a hit single with their version of "I Still Haven't Found What I'm Looking For".

Biography
Born in Edinburgh, Scotland, Peden began his career as a bass player and as a member of the Chimes. Peden has also produced an album for the British singer-songwriter, Lucie Silvas.

References

British record producers
Living people
Year of birth missing (living people)
Musicians from Edinburgh